Natale or Di Natale is a surname of Italian origin which means "of Christmas". People with that name include:
 Antonio Di Natale (born 1977), Italian footballer
 Cindi Di Natale (active 2013), Argentine racing cyclist
 Germana Di Natale (born 1974), Italian former professional tennis player
 Richard Di Natale (born 1970), Australian politician
 Stephen DiNatale (active 2016), U.S. politician in Massachusetts
 Jack Dinatale (born 1958), Australian rules footballer
 Andrea Natale, Italian-born American cardiologist and electrophysiologist
 Anthony Natale, American actor
 Greg Natale (born 1974), Australian designer
 Ralph Natale (born 1935), American organized criminal
 Sonia Natale (born 1972), Argentine mathematician

Italian-language surnames